Powerlifting at the 2011 Pacific Games in Nouméa, New Caledonia were held on September 8–9, 2011.

Medal summary

Medal table

Men

Women

References

Powerlifting at the 2011 Pacific Games
Metang Wak disqualified for doping 
Oceania Powerlifting Federation PG 2011 Results

2011 Pacific Games
2011